Daniel Russell Hodgdon was an American college administrator, better known for his series of science books for young people. He was born on April 13, 1885 in Winthrop, Maine.  He was a co-founder and later the President of New Jersey Institute of Technology (called at the time Newark College of Engineering) from 1918 until 1920. In 1920 he became the president of Hahnemann Medical College and Hospital and then Valparaiso University in Indiana.  He resigned abruptly from Valparaiso on April 25, 1921, telling the trustees that "The university is a hotbed of Bolshevism, communism and other cults, and nothing we could do to thwart their propaganda has been of any avail because of inside influences."    

Hodgdon was an author and co-author of the Creative Science Series of textbooks published by Hinds, Hayden & Eldredge, Inc., between 1919 and 1939, such as Junior General Science, Elementary General Science (1919) and Everyman's Science.  Hodgdon died in Santa Barbara, California on March 7, 1957.

References

New Jersey Institute of Technology